Beautiful Life is a studio album by American jazz singer Dianne Reeves released in 2014 by Concord label. It won a Grammy Award for "Best Jazz Vocal Album".

Reception
Christopher Loudon of JazzTimes stated: "The half-decade absence has done nothing to diminish the power or glory of Reeves’ voice on record. Though she’s long been touted as an heir to Ella or Sarah, here she adopts a smoother, more soulful sound that’s closer in spirit to Anita Baker... Rounding out the playlist are five originals written or co-written by Reeves. All are good; two–the post-breakup anthem 'Cold' and the fiery 'Tango'–are exceptional."

Recording
The main recording location was Kaleidoscope Sound, Union City, NJ, with additional sessions at Highend Studio, New York, NY; Rocky Mountain Recorders, Denver, CO; Wellspring Sound, Acton, MA; Bobby Sparks Enterprises, Mesquite, TX.

Track listing

References 

Dianne Reeves albums
Concord Records albums
2014 albums